Iran has the fourth largest oil reserves and the 2nd largest natural gas reserves in the world. The nation is a member of OPEC, and generates approximately 50% of state revenue through oil exports.

Most energy in Iran is generated through natural gas, and the country is the third largest producer of natural gas in the world.

Oil in Iran is a major cause of air pollution and greenhouse gas emissions. 

Iran also has the ability to generate significant power from renewable resources; due to the nation's closeness to the equator, 90% of its land area could provide solar power for at least 300 days a year.  solar power is very underdeveloped.

History
Iran is in a constant battle to use its energy resources more effectively in the face of subsidization and the need for technological advances in energy exploration and production. Energy wastage in Iran amounts to six or seven billion dollars (2008). The energy consumption in the country is extraordinarily higher than international standards. Iran paid $84 billion in subsidies for oil, gas and electricity in 2008. Iran is one of the most energy-intensive countries of the world, with per capita energy consumption 15 times that of Japan and 10 times that of European Union. Also due to huge energy subsidies, Iran is one of the most energy inefficient countries of the world, with the energy intensity three times higher than global average and 2.5 times the middle eastern average. Half of the country’s energy is wasted in domestic sector, 3.4 of which is wasted through single-occupancy vehicle use and 2/3 parts of power plants' energy are also wasted.

Iran is one of the leading members of OPEC (Organization of Petroleum Exporting Countries) and the Organization of Gas Exporting Countries (GECF). Iran received $47 billion in oil export revenues, which accounts for about 50% of state revenues.  Natural gas and oil consumption both account for about half of Iran’s domestic energy consumption.  With its heavy dependence on oil and gas revenues Iran continues to explore for new sources of natural gas and oil.  Recently Iran has focused its energy sector on the exploration of the South Pars offshore natural gas fields in the Persian Gulf.

Iran has become self-sufficient in designing, building and operating dams and power plants and it has won a good number of international bids in competition with foreign firms.

Energy generation capacity of Iranian thermal power plants reached 173 terawatt hours in 2007, accounting for 17.9 percent of energy production in the Middle East and African region. Natural gas has been the main energy in Iran in 2007, comprising over 55 percent of energy needs, while oil and hydroelectricity accounted for 42 and 2 percent respectively. The region’s energy need will increase by 26.8 percent until 2012. In 2017, the fuel consumption in Iran was equivalent to 5.5 million barrels of fuel per day (bpd), the rate of which is considered as the highest energy consumption rate in the world in terms of energy intensity.

Energy plays an important role in Iranian politics. Robert Baer in his 2008 book The Devil We Know: Dealing with the New Iranian Superpower argued that Iran had attained the status of an energy superpower and was on its way to become a military-political superpower.

Iran plans to create an energy saving company in conjunction with the Iranian subsidy reform plan (2014).

Primary energy sources
Primary energy supply is around two thirds gas and one third oil, with tiny amounts from other sources.

Natural gas 

Iran is the world's third producer of natural gas (5.1% of the world's total and 184 BCM); which is primarily used for domestic electricity generation or heat production. It contains an estimated   (Tcf) in proven natural gas reserves. In 2005 a large share of Iran’s natural gas reserves were believed to remain untapped. About 62% of these reserves are located in non-associated fields. Iranian production of natural gas is expected to increase over the next few years due to continuing discoveries in the North Pars and South Pars regions.

Domestic consumption is expected to go up at about 7% per year for the following decade. The Iranian government has also subsidized natural gas prices along with gasoline prices, and this is expected to sustain this high level of domestic consumption. In lieu of this increasing domestic demand, natural gas exports are expected to decrease in the following years.

Iran has the third largest consumption of natural gas in the world after United States and Russia. Iran also has the world's largest growth rate in natural gas consumption.

Natural gas:
 production: 151.8 billion cu m (2011 est.)
 consumption: 144.6 billion cu m (2010 est.)
 exports: 9.05 billion cu m (2011 est.)
 imports: 10.59 billion cu m (2011 est.)
 proved reserves: 33.61 trillion cu m (1 January 2013 est.)

Oil

Iran has the second largest oil reserves in the world, and the third largest exporter of it. By the end of 2009, Iranian oil R/P ratio was 89.4 years which is the world's highest. By 2009, Iran had 52 active rigs and 1,853 producing oil wells.

Iran possesses abundant fuels from which to generate energy. Since 1913 Iran has been a major oil-exporting country. Following the 1979 revolution, however, the government reduced daily oil production in accordance with an oil conservation policy. Further production declines occurred as result of damage to oil facilities during the war with Iraq. In the early 2000s, industry infrastructure was increasingly inefficient because of technological lags. Few exploratory wells were drilled in 2005. Iranian oil was nationalized in 1953 and thus is owned and operated by the National Iranian Oil Company (NIOC).

Oil also is found in northern Iran and in the offshore waters of the Persian Gulf. Nevertheless, in 2005 Iran spent US$4 billion on gasoline imports, mainly because of contraband and inefficient domestic use that result from subsidies. Iran is one of the largest gasoline consumers in the world ranking second behind United States in consumption per car.

There is a growing recognition that prices must rise faster to curb consumption and ease the burden on the public finances. Cheap energy has encouraged wasteful consumption in Iran, and a brisk business in smuggling petrol into Iraq, Turkey, Pakistan and Afghanistan. Demand has also been supported by rapid increases in car production in recent years. In the absence of imports, the car industry has developed strongly (albeit from a low base) with output reaching over 1m vehicles in fiscal year 2006/07 (March 21 – March 20).

The growth in consumption of domestically produced oil has been modest, owing to refining constraints. These imports are proving expensive, costing the government about US$4bn in the first nine months of 2007/08, according to parliamentary sources. Nearly 40% of refined oil consumed by Iran is imported from India.

Iran contains 27 onshore and 13 offshore oil-producing fields, largely concentrated in the southwestern Khuzestan region near the Iraqi border.  The Iranian government is heavily reliant on oil revenues and they have heavily subsidized the energy industries, which figures out to be about 12% of Iran’s GDP. However, domestic oil consumption has decreased due to the alternative use of natural gas. Economic growth from these resources is uncertain and stunted in Iran due to these subsidies and population growth. Iran has been unable to reach it full production levels due to a combination of sanctions and war plaguing the region. Iran’s oil fields have a natural decline rate at 8 percent for onshore wells and 10% for offshore fields. The Iranian recovery rate is currently approximately 27 percent, which is well below the world average. Iran needs structural improvements made to coincide with their enhanced oil recovery efforts.

Oil:
 production:  (2012 est.)
 consumption:  (2008 est.) (expected to increase 10% each year since 2006)
 exports:  (2010 est.)
 imports:  (2010 est.)
 proved reserves:  based on Iranian claims (1 January 2009 est.)

note: as of 2009, 1/3 of Iran's gasoline needs are imported because of insufficient domestic refining capacity, over-consumption and contraband.

Nuclear energy

Iran plans to generate 23,000 MW of electricity through nuclear technology to meet its increasing demand for energy. The first of four 915 MW reactors of Bushehr Nuclear Power Plant, built with help from Russia, came online in August 2010. While nuclear power in the US costs a little over 10 cents per kilowatt hour, Iran, with domestic uranium enrichment capabilities, high interest rates, low energy output (a single 1,000-watt reactor), low efficiency, extremely slow reactor construction, and no reprocessing pays around 68 cents per kilowatt hour (this assumes a price of $140 per separative working unit and of $40 per kilogram of uranium).

Hydro

Droughts have reduced hydropower. The Energy Ministry plans to improve existing plants and build more small and medium hydro.

Biofuel
In 2016, the Iranian Biofuel Society (IBS) in collaboration with the Vice Presidency for Science of Technology and Tehran and the Suburbs Bus Company executed the first urban pilot project for the consumption of waste cooking oil biodiesel in Tehran`s bus fleet in an attempt to generate public awareness regarding Global Climate Change, wherein they recommend “reducing net anthropogenic CO2 emissions to the atmosphere” and “minimizing anthropogenic disturbances of” atmospheric gasses by partial replacement of fossil fuels with waste-oriented biofuels. The program was also supported by Small Grant Programme, Global Environmental Facility, United Nation Development Program (SGP/GEF/UNDP) Office in Iran.

Solar
In 2021 there were 450 MW of solar power, less than 1% of installed capacity. This is tiny compared to electricity demand and neighbouring countries. 

Iran has an average of 2,200 kilowatt-hour solar radiation per square meter annually, and 90% of the country has enough sun to generate solar power 300 days a year.

Wind
In 2020 there were just over 300 MW of wind power, less than 1% of installed capacity. The east is suitable to build more, and wind there matches annual demand variation, being higher in spring and summer.

Geothermal

According to global tectonics Iran is impacted by subduction of the Arabian Plate under the Central Iranian Plate and four thrust faults: two that make the Southern Caspian Sea Depression and two in the north of Iran, part of the Caucasian Range. Mt. Sabalan and Mt. Sahand are two Quaternary Volcanos in the area. Sabalan is a large stratovolcano consisting of 3 summits named Soltan (4811), Heram (4612m) and Kasra (4573m). The stratovolcano is situated on a possible horst trending northeast-southwest and erupted at latest in the Holocene. Caldera collapsing has caused a depression about 400 m in height and 12 km in diameter. The lava flows consists of trachyandesite, andesite and dacite and pyroclastic deposits. There are 9 hot springs with a temperature in the range of 25-85 °C.

Electricity

Iran’s domestic consumption and production have steadily grown together since 1984 and it is still heavily reliant on traditional thermal energy sources of electricity, with a small fraction being produced by hydroelectric plants. Consumption has steadily risen and it is expected to rise at about 6 percent per year for the following decade. Accordingly, the Iranian energy sector must focus its efforts on meeting this continuing demand. Today Iran ranks 19th largest producer and 20th largest consumer of electricity in the world. A research by the Ministry of Energy indicated that between 15,000-20,000 megawatts of capacity should be added in Iran in the next 20 years. In recent years Iran has put greater emphasis on participation of domestic and foreign investors in electricity generation sector, with projects underway to add 40,000 MWh more capacity to the national grid.

It is estimated that some 18.5 percent of electricity generated in Iran are wasted before it reaches consumers due to technical problems. Iran is among the top ten manufacturers of gas turbines with a capacity of 160 megawatts. Iran has acquired self-sufficiency of over 80 percent in constructing hydraulic turbines and over 90 percent in producing gas turbines. Within the next few years, Iran can join the list of countries that produce power plant technology (2009). Iran has achieved the technical expertise to set up hydroelectric, gas and combined cycle power plants. Iran is not only self-sufficient in power plant construction but has also concluded a number of contracts on implementing projects in neighboring states.

The exploration efforts for sources of power generation are wide and diverse in Iran. Plans are being made to make oil efficient power plants as well as an emphasis on natural gas production in order to meet their growing electricity demand. Nuclear power and hydroelectric power are not focused on for the time being, but they are part of an overall strategy to meet electricity demands. The electricity sector is also heavily subsidized and mostly state owned companies control power distribution, transmission and generation. In order to meet the demands of the electricity sector, however, Iran is beginning to look into private investment. A by-law has been passed allowing the energy ministry to conclude rial or combined rial/foreign-currency contracts for the purchase of electricity from private companies.

Although some criticize Iran's hydroelectric power plans as potentially dangerous to the environment, most agree that the country's current state of hydroelectric production is much better off than in the past. Iran has displayed a new approach to this sector.  After the 1979 Islamic Revolution, the construction of hydroelectric power plants became both a popular private and public venture. Often, construction projects did not meet basic environmental standards, engineering standards, and technical requirements. As a result, many of these dams were destroyed or left in dilapidated conditions.

By 2004, the addition of new hydroelectric stations and the streamlining of conventional coal- and oil-fired stations increased installed capacity to 33,000 megawatts (MW). Of that amount, about 75 percent was based on natural gas, 18 percent on oil, and 7 percent on hydroelectric power. However, in 2004 Iran opened its first wind-powered and geothermal plants, and the first solar thermal plant was to come online in 2009.

Demographic trends and intensified industrialization have caused electric power demand to grow by 8 percent per year. It has also been estimated that Iran has the potential to produce at least 6,150 MWh of electricity by Wave power from its coastline on Persian Gulf alone. Iran is also experimenting with electricity generation from organic wastes and plans to build power plants using sewage and organic waste of domestic and industrial origin as fuel. With about 300 clear sunny days a year and an average of 2,200 kilowatt-hour solar radiation per square meter, Iran has a great potential to tap solar energy.

Electricity:
 production: 220.3 billion kWh (2011 est.)
 consumption: 182.7 billion kWh (2010 est.)
 exports: 6.707 billion kWh (2010 est.)
 imports: 3.015 billion kWh (2010 est.)

Electricity production by source:
 fossil fuel: 93% (75% comes from gas generation, 18% from oil) (2006); 86.2% of total installed capacity (2010 est.)
 hydro: 7% (2006); 13.7% of total installed capacity (2010 est.)

Energy forecast

Subsidies

Iran was estimated to have paid 19% of GDP for energy subsidies in 2019.

Iran is the world largest energy subsidizer, leading to highly wasteful consumption patterns, price distortions in its economy, pollution and very lucrative contraband with neighboring countries because of price differentials.

Environment
Air pollution, much of which is from fossil fuels, is estimated to cause nearly 3000 deaths a year in Tehran alone.
 CO2 emissions per capita: 11.9  tonnes (2015 est.)
 GDP per unit of energy use: 4.0 (2007)
 Energy use per capita (kg of oil equivalent) (2005 PPP $ per kg of oil equivalent): 2,352 (2007)

Renewable energy

In 2010, the Iranian government announced plans to build 2,000 MW of renewable energy capacity between 2010 and 2015. As of 2010, Iran had 8,500 MW of hydroelectric capacity and 130 MW of wind energy capacity. As at 2010, private companies had signed contracts to build more than 600 MW of biomass systems and 500 MW of new wind energy projects.

Iran is also working to make renewable energy commercially viable and the Ministry of Energy is required to buy privately produced renewable energy at world market prices. A feed-in-tariff for wind and biomass energy around 13 cents/kWh is helpful.

In 2012, Iran allocated €500 million from the National Development Fund for renewable energy projects. Also supporting the solar industry is the state-sponsored Renewable Energy Organization of Iran (SUNA), which is attached to the Energy Ministry and enjoys a budget of around $60 million.

See also
Economy of Iran
Energy development
International rankings of Iran
Ministry of Energy (Iran)
Oil megaprojects (2011)
Wind power in Iran
Nationalization of the Iranian oil industry
List of renewable energy topics by country

References

External links

 Ministry of Energy Of Iran - Official Website
 Renewable Energy & Energy Efficiency Organization Of Iran  - Official Website
 Ministry of Economic Affairs and Finance Of Iran - Official Website
 Ministry of Industry , Mine & Trade  Of Iran – Official Website
Iran Energy Profile - International Energy Agency
Annual Reviews - Reports by the Central Bank of Iran, including statistics about the energy sector in Iran.
US Department of Energy - Iran
Brief Sector & Environment Study (2003)
Energy Security Implications of an Iran in Transition
Tavanir - Iran's Electric Power Generation Organization
Ahmadinejad's Gas Revolution: A Plan to Defeat Economic Sanctions
IAEA: Energy and electricity in Iran (2002)
Solar insolation maps